The 2006 Abilene Christian Wildcats football team was an American football team that represented Abilene Christian University (ACU) as a member of the South Division of Lone Star Conference (LSC) during the 2006 NCAA Division II football season. In their second season under head coach Chris Thomsen, the Wildcats compiled an overall record of 8–3 record with a mark of 7–2 against conference opponents.

The team played its home games at Shotwell Stadium in Abilene, Texas.

Schedule

References

Abilene Christian
Abilene Christian Wildcats football seasons
Abilene Christian Wildcats football